Natalia Sergeyevna Gantimurova (born 14 August 1991)  is a Russian beauty pageant titleholder who was crowned Miss Russia 2011 and represented her Russia in the 2011 Miss Universe and Miss World pageants.

Early life
She descends from Russian princely family of Evenki Gantimurov. Born in Chelyabinsk to parents Sergei Gantimurov and Svetlana Nosyreva, Gantimurova is pursuing a bachelor's degree in international relations at Russian State University for the Humanities and knows two foreign languages. She also enjoys snowboarding.

Miss Russia 2011

Miss Universe and Miss World 2011
As the official representative of her country to the 2011 Miss Universe pageant, broadcast live from São Paulo, Brazil on September 12, 2011, Gantimurova vied to succeed current Miss Universe titleholder, Ximena Navarrete of Mexico, but failed to place. She later competed in Miss World 2011 in London, the United Kingdom on November 6, 2011, trying to conquer Russia's third Miss World title, and placed in the quarter finals (top 30).

References

External links
 Official Miss Russia website 

1991 births
Natalia
Living people
Miss Russia winners
Miss Universe 2011 contestants
Miss World 2011 delegates
People from Chelyabinsk
Russian State University for the Humanities alumni